Baconend Green is a hamlet in the Uttlesford district of Essex, England. It is within the parish of Great Canfield.

Hamlets in Essex
Uttlesford